Victor Borg (8 April 1916 – 27 June 1996) was a Norwegian physician, novelist, playwright and script writer.

Borg was born in Kristiania and was a physician at the institution Blå Kors from 1959 to 1983. He wrote several books on alcoholism and drug abuse, including Trøster og tyrann (1962), Narkomani (1970), and Skadeskutt: ungdom og narkotika (1977). He wrote several plays, scripts for the films Skadeskutt (1951), Broder Gabrielsen (1966), and Himmel og helvete (1969), and several novels and short stories.

References

1916 births
1996 deaths
Norwegian addiction physicians
Norwegian dramatists and playwrights
Norwegian non-fiction writers
20th-century Norwegian novelists